Mecula District is a district of Niassa Province in north-western Mozambique. The principal town is Mecula.

Part of the Niassa Reserve is located in this district.

Further reading
District profile (PDF)

Districts in Niassa Province